Nevada is a city in, and the county seat of, Story County, Iowa, United States. The population was 6,925 in the 2020 census, an increase from 6,658 in 2000. Nevada is part of the Ames, Iowa Metropolitan Statistical Area, which is a part of the larger Ames-Boone, Iowa Combined Statistical Area. Nevada is the second-most populous city in Story County. The city's name is pronounced differently from the U.S. state of Nevada.

History 

Nevada was platted in 1853. It was named after the Sierra Nevada mountains. On October 11, 1853 the T. E. Alderman family moved into the first structure in Nevada. This Structure served as Pioneer Store, Post office, and Court Room. A post office has been in operation in Nevada since 1854.

Historic properties in Nevada include Briggs Terrace Evergreen Lane Property, completed in 1879, and the Nevada Downtown Historic District, listed on the National Register of Historic Places in 2003. In 2019, the district became the 54th Main Street Iowa community, part of the larger Main Street Programs in the United States.

Geography 
Nevada's longitude and latitude coordinates in decimal form are 42.019152, -93.451775.

Demographics

2010 census
As of the census of 2010, there were 6,798 people, 2,761 households, and 1,811 families residing in the city. The racial makeup of the city was 94.3% White, 1.3% African American, 0.3% Native American, 1.0% Asian, 1.7% from other races, and 1.5% from two or more races. Hispanic or Latino of any race were 3.4% of the population.

There were 2,761 households, of which 34.0% had children under the age of 18 living with them, 51.3% were married couples living together, 10.6% had a female householder with no husband present, 3.7% had a male householder with no wife present, and 34.4% were non-families. 29.6% of all households were made up of individuals, and 10.5% had someone living alone who was 65 years of age or older. The average household size was 2.38 and the average family size was 2.94.

The median age in the city was 37.1 years. 25.3% of residents were under the age of 18; 7.6% were between the ages of 18 and 24; 27.1% were from 25 to 44; 26.1% were from 45 to 64; and 14% were 65 years of age or older. The gender makeup of the city was 48.6% male and 51.4% female.

2000 census
As of the census of 2000, there were 6,658 people, 2,716 households, and 1,787 families residing in the city. The racial makeup of the city was 96.97% White, 0.59% African American, 0.14% Native American, 0.66% Asian, 0.54% from other races, and 1.11% from two or more races. Hispanic or Latino of any race were 1.02% of the population.

There were 2,716 households, out of which 33.07% had children under the age of 18 living with them, 53.5% were married couples living together, 9.2% had a female householder with no husband present, and 34.2% were non-families. 28.1% of all households were made up of individuals, and 11.5% had someone living alone who was 65 years of age or older. The average household size was 2.38 and the average family size was 2.92.

Age spread: 24.9% under the age of 18, 9.8% from 18 to 24, 30.8% from 25 to 44, 20.3% from 45 to 64, and 14.2% who were 65 years of age or older. The median age was 35 years. For every 100 females, there were 93.4 males. For every 100 females age 18 and over, there were 91.5 males.

The median income for a household in the city was $42,527, and the median income for a family was $48,700. Males had a median income of $32,635 versus $24,680 for females. The per capita income for the city was $20,392. About 3.9% of families and 5.6% of the population were below the poverty line, including 4.4% of those under age 18 and 3.2% of those age 65 or over.

Media 
Newsprint
The Nevada Journal publishes a weekly newspaper which comes out on Thursday, and the "Story Today" released on Wednesday. The Nevada Journal provides in-depth coverage of local and regional issues as well as sports and is the official newspaper for the City of Nevada.

National news coverage is provided on a daily basis by the Des Moines Register and the Ames Tribune.

Radio and television
While Nevada has no broadcast stations of its own, it is well served from the Ames-Des Moines television and radio markets.

Nevada is featured in John Darnielle's 2017 novel Universal Harvester.

Transportation 
Nevada is served by US Highway 30 which was known as the Lincoln Highway and Lincoln Way in town. It bisects Nevada north and south through the business district. A new US Highway 30 bypass was built in the 1970s to the south of the city and Lincoln Way through town was reduced to county road status. Iowa Highway 133 now connects the business district to the new US Highway 30 to the south. Nevada is also served well by a network of paved farm to market county roads.

Nevada was served by the Chicago and North Western Railroad. The Union Pacific Railroad now owns the line which crosses the city east to west north of the business district. Up until the mid-1980s, all railroad crossings except for a new one in the northwest section of town were protected by WRRS center harp style wigwag signals. Shortly thereafter, these signals were replaced with standard flashers and gates due to safety concerns and lack of available wigwag parts.

Nevada was also served by the Chicago, Rock Island and Pacific Railroad's "Spine Line" between Minneapolis, MN and Kansas City, MO. This north-south line jogged east-west through southern Nevada. It then veered north again and crossed under the C&NW mainline east of Nevada. An agency station was maintained until 1980 when the Rock Island went bankrupt and ceased to function.

The C&NW purchased the Rock Island "Spine Line" which offered better and more direct connections for Minneapolis and Kansas City. Since the two rail lines did not directly interchange east of town where the C&NW crosses over the Rock Island, a new connection on the west side of Nevada was built. It goes from the C&NW east-west main line to connect with the former Rock Island on the southwest side of Nevada. The junction on the Spine Line was referred to as "Chicago Junction" while the junction on the east-west mainline was referred to as "Kansas City Junction". This new line necessitated the building of an overpass for the old Lincoln Highway on the west side of Nevada.

The Union Pacific Railroad purchased the Chicago and North Western Railroad in 1995. Rail traffic on both the east-west mainline and the "Spine Line" along with interchange traffic has increased considerably in the years since the purchase.

Education 
Nevada Community School District operates public schools. The school colors are purple and gold, and the mascot is a cub.

Central Elementary School 
Nevada Community Middle School 
Nevada Community High School 
Nevada Community Resource Center

In popular culture 
The 2017 novel Universal Harvester by American novelist and singer-songwriter John Darnielle is set primarily in Nevada.

Notable people  

Dayton Countryman (1918–2011), Iowa Attorney General
Neva Patterson (1920–2010), actress
Paul Rhoads (born 1967) college football coach, former head coach at Iowa State University
Billy Sunday, baseball player and evangelist
Michael Wacha, baseball player for St. Louis Cardinals, grandson of a local family

References

Further reading
 Nevada Community Historical Society, Inc. (2003). Voices from the Past: The Story of Nevada, Iowa, Its Community and Families. Unknown press (Nevada Community Historical Society, Inc., PO Box 213, Nevada, Iowa 50201-0213; 515-382-6684)

External links

 
City of Nevada website
City-Data Comprehensive Statistical Data and more about Nevada

Cities in Iowa
Cities in Story County, Iowa
County seats in Iowa
Populated places established in 1853
1853 establishments in Iowa